Charles Lambert (5 March 1932 – 5 June 1990) was a French water polo player. He competed in the men's tournament at the 1960 Summer Olympics.

References

1932 births
1990 deaths
French male water polo players
Olympic water polo players of France
Water polo players at the 1960 Summer Olympics
Sportspeople from Strasbourg